Felt Racing is an American bicycle brand based in Irvine, California. Felt produces road, track, cyclocross, electric bicycles, and cruiser bikes. All design is completed in the United States and the majority of production comes from Asia. The company also has a strong reputation in the time trial/triathlon bike area and for several years provided bicycles to UCI teams in the Tour de France. Felt still supports several professional level race teams including Hincapie Racing and Team Twenty 16.

History
Felt was founded by Jim Felt in early 1994 when Felt products were distributed by Answer Products. Felt nearly disappeared from the domestic market following a fallout with Answer after a seven-year relationship. The brand was relaunched in 2001 as an independent company.

On February 3, 2017, Rossignol Group announced the acquisition of Felt Bicycles.  The announcement noted that Felt had grown to $60 million in revenue at the time of sale, though terms of the acquisition were not disclosed.

Rossignol announced in March 2022 that it is selling Felt Bicycles to Pierer Mobility.

Technology
Felt has developed several unique bicycle technologies. For its time trial/triathlon bikes, Felt has developed the Bayonet Fork, which utilizes an external steerer in front of the head tube for additional stiffness and aerodynamic efficiency. Felt has also developed the Equilink suspension system for its full-suspension mountain bikes.

Felt extensively utilizes wind tunnel and computational fluid dynamics modeling in its frame design process.

Recall
Felt has issued a recall of 2009 Felt model B12, B16 and S32 road bicycles because the fork steer tube can break, causing the rider to lose control, fall and suffer injuries.

Sponsorships

In 2007 Felt sponsored the  bicycle team. In 2009, Felt signed a three-year agreement to supply frames to the  team. Felt chose not to exercise its option with the Boulder-based cycling team after a four-year working agreement. In 2014 Felt became the bike sponsor to the US Continental team, .

The US Women's track cycling team won a silver medal riding Felt bicycles at the 2016 Olympics in Rio.

Athletes sponsored by Felt

Daniela Ryf
 Mirinda Carfrae
 Sarah Hammer
 Tim DeBoom

Gallery

References

External links
Felt Racing
Felt Bicycles - USA web site
Felt Bicycles - Canada web site
Felt Bicycles - European web site
Felt Bicycles - International web site

Cycle manufacturers of the United States
Mountain bike manufacturers
Manufacturing companies based in Greater Los Angeles
Companies based in Irvine, California